The American Christmas Tree Association is an American, non-profit organization and industry trade group that represents those involved in the artificial Christmas tree industry.  The president of the group is Thomas Harman, who is also the president and CEO of Balsam Hill, a seller of artificial trees.  

In November 2008, the association launched a new website, which, according to the association, was meant to, "promote accurate and factual consumer information and provide consumers with the tools they need to make an educated choice about the right tree for their holiday and family enjoyment". 

The American Christmas Tree Association is based in West Hollywood, California.

See also
British Christmas Tree Growers Association
National Christmas Tree Association

References

External links

Artificial Christmas trees
Trade associations based in the United States
Non-profit organizations based in California